Director of Naval Communications was a post on the staff of the United States Navy's Chief of Naval Operations responsible for organizing, administering and operating the Naval Communications Service.  In Navy parlance, this was Op-20.  Created in 1916, the position replaced that of the Superintendent of the Naval Radio Service, created in 1912.  The position, and the responsibilities, evolved steadily over the next several generations.

Directors of Naval Communications, 1912-1950

 1912-1916                  Capt. William H.G. Bullard [previously Superintendent of the Naval Radio Service]
 1916-1919                  Capt. David W. Todd
 1919-1921                  Rear Admiral William H.G. Bullard
 1921                       Rear Admiral Marbury Johnston
 1921-1922                  Capt. Samuel W. Bryant (acting)
 1922-1923                  Rear Admiral Henry J. Ziegemeier
 1923                       Commander Donald C. Bingham
 1923-1924                  Capt. Orton P. Jackson
 1924-1927                  Capt. Ridley McLean
 1927-1928                  Rear Admiral Thomas T. Craven
 1928-1935                  Capt. Stanford C. Hooper
 1935-1936                  Rear Admiral Gilbert Jonathan Rowcliff
 1936-1939                  Rear Admiral Charles E. Courtney
 June 1939-February 1942         Rear Admiral Leigh Noyes
 February–September 1942    Capt. Joseph R. Redman
 September 1942-April 1943  Capt. Carl Frederick Holden
 April 1943-August 1945     Rear Admiral Joseph R. Redman
 1946-1949                  Rear Admiral Earl E. Stone
 1949-1951                  Rear Admiral John R. Redman
 1951-1952                  Captain Wilfred B. Goulett

Evolution of Naval Communications after 1950
The Naval Communications Service was created as a subset of the Naval Communications System on 29 August 1950 by the Chief of Naval Operations, with the Director of Naval Communications overseeing this from Washington, D.C. In 1959, as a result of the Committee on the Organization of the Department of the Navy (known as the Franke Report), the title of the Director of Naval Communications became the Assistant Chief of Naval Operations (Communications)/Director Naval Communications.  After the reorganization of OPNAV in 1966-67 following the Benson report, the incumbent was simultaneously a member of the Chief of Naval Operations' own staff and in charge of a new independent command, the Naval Communications Command.

Directors of Naval Communications, 1950-1971
Rear Admiral Henry C. Bruton (dates unclear)
1961-1965 Rear Admiral Bernard F. Roeder
1965-1968        Rear Admiral Robert H. Weeks
1968 (Mar-July)  Captain Robert H. White
1968-1971        Rear Admiral Francis J. Fitzpatrick

Evolution of Naval Communications after 1971
In 1971, Naval Communications Command was subordinated to a new OP-94 entity, the Director, Command Support Programs (OP-94) in March 1971, with naval communications becoming a new entity, OP-941 underneath.  On 1 June 1973, the command was redesignated the Naval Telecommunications Command.

In December 1990, this was redesignated the Naval Computer and Telecommunications Command.

In 2002, this combined with several other U.S. Navy elements to form the new Naval Network Warfare Command, which in 2010 joined with several other elements to be a part of Fleet Cyber Command/United States Tenth Fleet, a component of United States Cyber Command.

Directors of Naval Communications since 1973
1971-1973        Rear Admiral Samuel L. Gravely, Jr.
1973-1975        Rear Admiral Jon L. Boyes
1977-1980        Rear Admiral Clyde R. Bell

References

Office of the Chief of Naval Operations